Edward Winslow Gifford (August 14, 1887 – May 16, 1959) devoted his life to studying California Indian ethnography as a professor of anthropology and director of the Museum of Anthropology at the University of California, Berkeley.

Born in Oakland, California, he became an assistant curator of ornithology at the California Academy of Sciences after graduating from high school; he never attended college. He joined the University of California's Museum of Anthropology in 1912 as an assistant curator. In the 1920s he was sent to Tonga with William C. McKern who was also from the University of California. These two and the botanist was Arthur J. Eames from Harvard University made up one of the four teams of the Bayard Dominick Expedition.

Gifford became a curator in 1925 and a professor in 1945. Working in close association with the preeminent leader in California anthropology, Alfred L. Kroeber, Gifford produced more than 100 publications. His numerous contributions to salvage ethnography have left an invaluable record of the state's native cultures. He developed the museum into a major U.S. institution with its major field research and collections. Although Gifford was less widely known than his colleague and supervisor Kroeber, he maintained a positive relationship with many Berkeley graduate students - often writing them with advice and ideas while they were engaged in fieldwork.

References

Calisphere - University of California - Edward Winslow Gifford, Anthropology: Berkeley
Foster, George M. 1960. "Edward Winslow Gifford". American Anthropologist 62:327-329.
Kroeber, A. L., and E. W. Gifford. Karok Myths. University of California Press, Berkeley.
Hurtado, Albert L. 1990. "Introduction to the Bison Book Edition". In California Indian Nights, compiled by Edward W. Gifford and Gwendoline Harris Block, pp. 1–7. University of Nebraska Press, Lincoln.
Redman, Samuel J. 2015. "Museum tours and the origins of museum studies: Edward W. Gifford, William R. Bascom, and the remaking of an anthropology museum." Museum Mangagement and Curatorship. Vol. 30, No. 5.

External links
 In Memoriam 1961 (Edward Winslow Gifford) (University of California)
 Edward Winslow Gifford. 1917. "Miwok Myths". University of California Publications in American Archeology and Ethnology 12:283-338.]
 Gifford, Edward W., and Robert H. Lowie. 1928. "Notes on the Akwa'ala Indians of Lower California". University of California Publications in American Archeology and Ethnology 23:338-352.
 

1887 births
1959 deaths
American ethnologists
American ethnographers
University of California, Berkeley College of Letters and Science faculty
Linguists of Uto-Aztecan languages
20th-century American anthropologists